Joint Stock Company Gazprom Promgaz (abbreviated JSC Gazprom Promgaz,) is a Russian company that specializes in structural engineering, design, research, heating, the electric power market, and other services related to natural gas. The company is a research institute of Gazprom and was established in 1949.

The headquarters of the company are in Moscow. Gazprom Promgaz has branches in Vidnoye (Moscow Oblast), Novokuznetsk (Kemerovo Oblast), Oryol, Saint Petersburg, Ufa, Stavropol, Astrakhan (Russia), Minsk (Belarus), and Bishkek (Kyrgyzstan). Gazprom Promgaz has also an associated company, Ltd "Kamensk Plant of Gas Equipment" in Kamensk-Shakhtinsky (Rostov Oblast).

History
The organization was established on 17 June 1949 and was primarily called the All-Union Research and Design Institute of Underground Coal Gasification or VNIIPodzemgaz. It was created from the Laboratory of Underground Gasification of the All-Union Gas Research Institute, and developed technologies of underground coal, oil shale and petroleum gasification.

The first director of VNIIPodzemgaz was Andrey Chernyshov. Under his direction, the basis of technology of underground coal gasification was developed and  awarded the Stalin prize. In 1954, technicians of VNIIPodzemgaz made hydraulic fracturing of the coal-bed for the first time in the world.

In 1964, VNIIPodzemgaz was renamed as the All-Union Research and Designed Institute of Industrial Gasification or VNIIPromgaz.

In the 1970s, the organization transformed into the all-Union research association, which consisted of the following:
 Research institute
 Central Asian branch in Tashkent (Uzbekistan)
 Three plants for making gas-powered equipment: - Kamensk-Shakhtinsky (Russia)- Fastov (Ukraine)- Leninabad (now Qanliko‘l, Uzbekistan)
 Startup and adjustment sectors
 State test center for gas burner devices
 Special planning and design bureau

During these years, the organization was headed by Nikolay Fyodorov. Since the early 1970s to the mid-1980s, the organization worked as the Coordinating Сentre for the Comecon countries on development of methods to use gas as a fuel and the creation of gas-powered equipment.

After the collapse of the Soviet Union and a series of reforms (including transformation of state enterprises into joint stock companies in 1994), VNIIPromgaz became Open Joint Stock Company Promgaz (OAO Promgaz) and was entirely focused on the development of technologies for effective gas use.

In 2008, Promgaz was renamed to OJSC Gazprom Promgaz.

In February 2013, professor Yury Spector became CEO.

In 2014, the company projected the general scheme for gas supply of Kyrgyzstan.

In 2015, Oleg Andreyev became CEO. OJSC Gazprom Promgaz was renamed to JSC Gazprom Promgaz. The company projected the general schemes for gas supply of South Ossetia and Armenia.

Operations
Gazprom Promgaz plans gas transportation and its distribution systems, as well as investigating various research in the field of natural gas. The company is the general planner of the natural gas supply program for Russian regions, developed by Gazprom. The company is also a research center of Gazprom in the field of regional power systems, the supply, distribution and use of gas, efficient energy use and energy-savings, price setting for construction of gas industry objectives, the development of regional hydrocarbon fields and development of non-traditional hydrocarbon resources including coal bed methane.

References

External links
Official website of Gazprom promgaz 
On Gazprom.com 
On Bloomberg Businessweek
 Official website of Kamensk Plant of Gas Equipment

Gazprom subsidiaries
Engineering companies of Russia
1949 establishments in the Soviet Union
Technology companies established in 1949
Research institutes established in 1949
Companies based in Moscow
Research institutes in the Soviet Union
Natural gas in the Soviet Union